The Silent Holocaust may refer to:
 Silent Holocaust (Judaism)
 Jewish assimilation
 Guatemalan genocide